Foster & Creighton was a construction contracting firm of Nashville, Tennessee.  It has been known also as the Foster-Creighton Company, as the Foster and Creighton Co., and as Foster and Creighton Company.

It was founded in 1885 by Wilbur F. Foster and Robert T. Creighton, who had both served as City Engineer of Nashville.  A third partner was bought out, early on, and the firm was known as Foster-Creighton Company.

A number of its works are listed on the National Register of Historic Places.

Works include:
Lock No. 3, after 1893, on the Cumberland River, for the Army Corps of Engineers
Green Bridge (New Orleans), which began construction in 1964
Vanderbilt Stadium in Nashville, Tennessee, for which the firm was project manager
Thomas Jefferson Hotel.
Bennie-Dillon Building, 702 Church St., Nashville, Tennessee (Foster & Creighton), NRHP-listed
Columbia Hydroelectric Station, Riverside Park, Riverside Dr. and Duck River, Columbia, Tennessee (Foster & Creighton), NRHP-listed
Guildfor Dudley Sr. and Anne Dallas, 5401 Hillsboro Pike, Forest Hills, Tennessee (Foster & Creighton), NRHP-listed
Lebanon Road Stone Arch Bridge, Over Brown's Creek at Lebanon Rd., Nashville, Tennessee (Foster & Creighton Co.), NRHP-listed
Lillard's Mill Hydroelectric Station, McLean Rd. and Duck River, Milltown, Tennessee (Foster & Creighton), NRHP-listed
Shelbyville Hydroelectric Station, TN 231 at Duck River, Shelbyville, Tennessee (Foster & Creighton), NRHP-listed

References

Construction and civil engineering companies of the United States
Companies based in Nashville, Tennessee
American companies established in 1885
1885 establishments in Tennessee